Pirinoa is a rural community east of Lake Wairarapa, in the South Wairarapa District and Wellington Region of New Zealand's North Island. It includes the rural settlement of Pirinoa, and the coastal settlement of Whāngaimoana.

Marae

Kohunui Marae, located in Pirinoa, is a tribal meeting ground for the Ngāti Kahungunu hapū of Ngāi Rangawhakairi, Ngāti Rākairangi and Ngāti Tūkoko, and the Rangitāne hapū of Ngāti Tūkoko. It has a wharenui or meeting house, called Te Tihi o Tuhirangi.

In October 2020, the Government committed $2,179,654 from the Provincial Growth Fund to upgrade Ngāi Tumapuhia a Rangi ki Okautete, Motuwairaka, Pāpāwai, Kohunui, Hurunui o Rangi and Te Oreore marae. The projects were expected to create 19.8 full time jobs.

Demographics 

Aorangi Forest had a population of 1,464 at the 2018 New Zealand census, an increase of 90 people (6.6%) since the 2013 census, and an increase of 255 people (21.1%) since the 2006 census. There were 594 households. There were 756 males and 708 females, giving a sex ratio of 1.07 males per female. The median age was 46.5 years (compared with 37.4 years nationally), with 270 people (18.4%) aged under 15 years, 198 (13.5%) aged 15 to 29, 681 (46.5%) aged 30 to 64, and 318 (21.7%) aged 65 or older.

Ethnicities were 92.8% European/Pākehā, 15.4% Māori, 1.0% Pacific peoples, 0.6% Asian, and 1.2% other ethnicities (totals add to more than 100% since people could identify with multiple ethnicities).

The proportion of people born overseas was 13.1%, compared with 27.1% nationally.

Although some people objected to giving their religion, 58.6% had no religion, 33.0% were Christian, 0.4% were Buddhist and 1.6% had other religions.

Of those at least 15 years old, 285 (23.9%) people had a bachelor or higher degree, and 186 (15.6%) people had no formal qualifications. The median income was $37,000, compared with $31,800 nationally. The employment status of those at least 15 was that 627 (52.5%) people were employed full-time, 210 (17.6%) were part-time, and 15 (1.3%) were unemployed.

Education

References

External links

South Wairarapa District
Populated places in the Wellington Region